Jordan participated in the 2011 Asian Winter Games in Almaty and Astana, Kazakhstan from January 30, 2011 to February 6, 2011. The nation sent 2 male athletes. Jordan was scheduled to send 3 athletes, but one withdrew due to injury.

Alpine skiing

Men
Khaled Badr-El-Din
Raja Badr-El-Din - Also, freestyle skiing.

Freestyle skiing

Leen Badr-El-Din
Raja Badr-El-Din - Also, Alpine skiing.

References

Nations at the 2011 Asian Winter Games
Asian Winter Games
Jordan at the Asian Winter Games